The Nakawuka-Kasanje-Mpigi Road, is a road in the Central Region of Uganda, connecting the towns of Nakawuka and Kasanje in Wakiso District to the city of Mpigi, the district capital of Mpigi District. When completed, the road is expected to ease travel between the city of Entebbe and Mpigi, Masaka and communities in the Western Region of Uganda. The road bypasses the road traffic congestion around Kampala, the national capital.

Location

On the map, the Nakiwogo-Mpigi section of this road is referred to as the Kasanje Road.

Upgrade to class II bitumen
The government of Uganda, with prodding from stakeholders are in the process of upgrading this road as well as the adjacent Kisubi-Nakawuka Road to class II bitumen surface, with drainage channels, culverts and shoulders.

After completion, transit time between Entebbe and Mpigi is expected to reduce to less than thirty minutes from the current two hours.

Developments
In August 2021, Yoweri Museveni, the President of Uganda directed Allen Kagina, the executive director of the Uganda National Roads Authority (UNRA), to award the construction contract of this road to China Communications Construction Company (CCCC), under the pre-financing model. Under this arrangement, CCCC would start work of designing and constructing the road, using own money and be paid by government in the second or third year of the project. In April 2022, UNRA listed this road under those in the "bidding stage".

See also
 List of roads in Uganda

Notes

References

External links
Website of Uganda National Roads Authority  
 Gov’t lists 15 roads to be upgraded in the next financial year As of 24 February 2022.

Roads in Uganda
Mpigi District
Wakiso District
Transport in Uganda